The Beehive Mountain was named by George M. Dawson in 1886. It is located in the High Rock Range of the Canadian Rockies and is on the boundary between British Columbia and Alberta, which follows the Continental Divide in this area. The mountain was named for its fancied resemblance to a beehive.

See also
Mountains of Alberta
Mountains of British Columbia
List of peaks on the Alberta–British Columbia border

References

Two-thousanders of Alberta
Two-thousanders of British Columbia
Canadian Rockies
Great Divide of North America